The John Lennon Educational Tour Bus ("Lennon Bus") was founded in 1998 as a non-profit 501(c)(3) organization "committed to reaching youth through music and video". While corporately based in New York City, the work is carried out through a traveling bus,  an audio and video recording studio on wheels.

The Bus travels from coast to coast, making stops at K-12 schools, universities, Boys and Girls Clubs, concerts, trade shows, music festivals and more. At most stops the staff conducts free tours while providing an opportunity for a group of youths to record an original song and video. Each stop typically culminates in a community celebration and screening of the music and video just produced on the Bus.  At some of its school visits, the Bus organizes a Battle of the Bands where students can engage in a friendly competition and the winning band may receive prizes.  The Bus has also co-produced a course with the Digital Media Academy that is offered at several universities each summer, called "Come Together: Music and Video Production." 

The Lennon Bus is connected to the professional recording industry.  Recording artists, including will.i.am, Natasha Bedingfield and Justin Timberlake have recorded on the Bus and participated in outreach programs. In addition to isolated recording sessions, the Bus has accompanied headlining artists, such as The Black Eyed Peas, on their concert tours, allowing these artists to continue working on their records while they are on the road.  Participants like Black Eyed Peas guitarist George Pajon and musical director Printz Board find time to inspire and be inspired.  

In 2006, Edutopia, The George Lucas Educational Foundation, featured the John Lennon Educational Tour Bus on Edutopia.org. Edutopia's video, "Making the Dreams of Young Musical Artists a Reality", and article, "Rock and Roll into Town: Students Make Tracks in a Recording Studio on Wheels", follow the bus' progress and interviews executive director, Brian Rothschild. The article and video also showcase student musical progress from the bus' instrumental and digital resources.

References

501(c)(3) organizations
Monuments and memorials to John Lennon